Sangareddy, is a city and district headquarters of the Sangareddy district in the Indian state of Telangana. It was named after the ruler Sanga, who was the son of Rani Shankaramba, a ruler of Medak during the period of Nizams.It is the largest city in the Sangareddy district.

Government and politics

Civic administration

The Sangareddy Municipality, classified as a first grade municipality with 38 election wards, was created in 1954.

Economy 
The city has three large-scale public sector industries. These are Bharat Heavy Electricals Limited (one of the Maharatna companies of the Indian government), Bharat Dynamics Limited (where one of India's most powerful missiles, Prithvi, was produced), and Ordnance Factory Medak (which manufactures the Sarath tanks for the Indian Army).

The city includes the Old Sangareddy and New Sangareddy sections. Old Sangareddy is known for its bazaars and old district jail, which has been converted to a jail museum and now called Heritage Jail Museum.

The city has access to a lot of Shopping malls, Showrooms, Restaurants, Hotels etc.

Education

Schools 
The following is a list of local schools and colleges:

 Goutham Model School, Sangareddy 
 Sai Grace High School, Sangareddy 
 Carey Baptist High School, Sangareddy 
 St. Anthony's High School, Shanthi Nagar
 Karuna High School, Sanjeeva Nagar
 Sri Vani High School, Manjeera Nagar
 Keshava Reddy Concept School, Kandi
 St.Anns High School,Sangareddy
 St.Joseph's high school, Shanthinagar
 BVM Concept school, Sangareddy
 Shree Gayathri high school, Sangareddy
 Littlebuds High school, Sangareddy
 Pioneers International School
 Government High school, Sangareddy
 Gandhi Centenary High School
 MNR School of Excellence, MNR campus, Sangareddy.
 Rishi high school
 Daffodils high school
 Sri Sai Krishna High School
 Nagarjuna Junior College
 Anthony Junior College
 Government Tara Degree College
 Wisdom Degree College
 Ellenki Degree College
 St. Anthony's High School, Vidya Nagar
 St. Peter's High School
 St. Arnold's High School
 Akshaya Junior College
 Spectra High School
 Kendriya vidyalaya, ODF
 Sri Chaitanya Junior College, Ammenpur
 Krishnaveni Talent school
 Spoorthy degree college
 Kakatiya Techno school
 Sahiti public high school
 Bhavani Primary School
 National Public school
 Akshara School

Higher Education 
The following are the centres of higher education in Sangareddy district:

 Indian Institute of Technology Hyderabad, Kandi Village, Sangareddy https://iith.ac.in/
 MNR Medical College, MNR Nagar, Fasalwadi, Narasapur Road, Sangareddy-502294
 JNTUH College of Engineering Sulthanpur
 GITAM University, Rudraram
 Prof N Ranga Agricultural University 
 Horticultural University
 Government Medical College, Sangareddy
Tara Government College (Autonomous) Sangareddy

Transport facilities.

Roads 
The NH-65 road passes through the town.

About 15 km away from Sangareddy is an outer ring road which connects to Shamshabad airport – Rajiv Gandhi International Airport, Hyderabad, Gachibowli, and Medchal.

A bypass road to NH44 is linked from Sangareddy to Shadnagar through Chevella.

Long distance travel options are also available from Sangareddy to Tirupati, Vizag, Vijayawada, and Kandukooru directly.

Rail 
The nearest railway stations are Shankarpalli railway station which is about 22 km away, Lingampally, which is about 30 km away, Secunderabad (about 50 km away) and Nampally Station, which is around 53 km away.

Air 
The nearest air transport facility is Hyderabad International Airport, which is 70 km from Sangareddy.

Media 
The Telugu dailies publishers in the city are Eenadu, Andhra Jyothy, and Sakshi. Apart from the local language, there are also English papers such as The Hindu, The Times of India, and The Hans India.

Notable People 
K V Anudeep - Film Director

References 

Sangareddy district
Cities and towns in Sangareddy district
District headquarters of Telangana